Canal Town Museum is a former bakery and residence now housing a museum and located at Canastota in Madison County, New York.  It was built about 1873 and is a small rectangular frame building surmounted by a low-pitched hipped roof.  It is representative of the type of combined commercial / residential structures that once lined the canal basin in Canastota's central business district.

It was added to the National Register of Historic Places in 1986.

References

External links
Canal Town Museum website

Museums on the National Register of Historic Places in New York (state)
Houses completed in 1873
Commercial buildings completed in 1873
Museums in Madison County, New York
History museums in New York (state)
Canal museums in the United States
National Register of Historic Places in Madison County, New York